Inertia is the second studio album by keyboardist Derek Sherinian, released in 2001 through Inside Out Music. This album marks the beginning of Sherinian's longtime collaborations with drummer Simon Phillips as well as guitarists Steve Lukather and Zakk Wylde.

Track listing

Personnel
Derek Sherinian – keyboard, engineering, production
Steve Lukather – guitar (tracks 1, 3, 5, 6, 8–10), electric sitar
Zakk Wylde – guitar (tracks 2, 4, 8)
Simon Phillips – drums, engineering, mixing, production
Jerry Goodman – electric violin
Tom Kennedy – bass (tracks 1, 6, 10)
Tony Franklin – bass (tracks 2–4, 8)
Jimmy Johnson – bass (5, 7)
Albert Law – engineering
Mitchel Forman – engineering
Phil Soussan – engineering
Tom Fletcher – engineering

References

External links
In Review: Derek Sherinian "Inertia" at Guitar Nine Records
http://www.insideoutmusic.com/release.aspx?IdRelease=836

Derek Sherinian albums
2001 albums
Inside Out Music albums
Albums produced by Simon Phillips (drummer)